The FA Cup 1982–83 is the 102nd season of the world's oldest football knockout competition; The Football Association Challenge Cup, or FA Cup for short. The large number of clubs entering the tournament from lower down the English football league system meant that the competition started with a number of preliminary and qualifying rounds. The 28 victorious teams from the Fourth Round Qualifying progressed to the First Round Proper.

Preliminary round

Ties

Replays

2nd replay

1st qualifying round

Ties

Replays

2nd replays

2nd qualifying round

Ties

Replays

2nd replays

3rd qualifying round

Ties

Replays

2nd replays

4th qualifying round
The teams that given byes to this round are Dagenham, Northwich Victoria, Scarborough, Weymouth, Boston United, Yeovil Town, Stafford Rangers, Maidstone United, Kettering Town, Gravesend & Northfleet, Bishop's Stortford, Sutton United, Mossley, Leatherhead, Workington, Minehead, Blyth Spartans, Barking, Harlow Town and Penrith.

Ties

Replays

1982–83 FA Cup
See 1982-83 FA Cup for details of the rounds from the First Round Proper onwards.

External links
Football Club History Database: FA Cup 1982–83
FA Cup Past Results

Qual
FA Cup qualifying rounds